Mohammed Abbas is an Egyptian football former coach.

Uganda
Assigned the Uganda national team manager role in 2004 as part of an agreement between the Ugandan and Egyptian governments, Abbas sought to put a sense of discipline into the squad upon arrival, targeting a place at the 2006 Africa Cup of Nations. However, despite leading the Cranes to a 2010 World Cup qualifying victory over Ecuador in 2006, the Egyptian tactician was relieved of his duties by March that year and was given an indemnification package worth 6000 US dollars following his dismissal.

On account of Uganda's display at the 2005 CECAFA Cup, a number of African countries, including Ethiopia, Sudan, and Rwanda expressed interest in hiring Abbas as their head coach but he chose to remain with the Cranes.

References

External links
 Abbas Dismissal Is No Reason To Celebrate
 No respect for me at all, says sacked Abbas
 Does Uganda need Abbas?

Egyptian expatriate football managers
Egyptian football managers
Expatriate football managers in Uganda
Uganda national football team managers
Year of birth missing (living people)
Living people
Egyptian expatriate sportspeople in Uganda